Yimella radicis is an endophytic bacterium from the genus Yimella which has been isolated from the roots of the plant Paris polyphylla var. yunnanensis from Zhongdian in China.

References

 

Micrococcales
Bacteria described in 2016